Lin Zhigang (born 1970) is a Chinese former international table tennis player.

He won a bronze medal at the 1993 World Table Tennis Championships and 1995 World Table Tennis Championships in the men's doubles with Liu Guoliang.

Lin Zhigang is married to table tennis legend Deng Yaping.

See also
 List of table tennis players

References

1970 births
Table tennis players from Guangdong
Chinese male table tennis players
Living people
World Table Tennis Championships medalists